Sefton Township is one of twenty townships in Fayette County, Illinois, USA.  As of the 2010 census, its population was 599 and it contained 256 housing units.

Geography

Cities, towns, villages
 Brownstown (northwest quarter)

Extinct towns
 Avena
 Sefton

Cemeteries
The township contains these seven cemeteries: Fairview, Forbis, Liberty, Mount Carmel, New Liberty, Padon and Zion.

Major highways
  U.S. Route 40

Airports and landing strips
 Miller Landing Strip

Demographics

School districts
 Brownstown Community Unit School District 201
 Ramsey Community Unit School District 204
 St Elmo Community Unit School District 202
 Vandalia Community Unit School District 203

Political districts
 Illinois' 19th congressional district
 State House District 102
 State Senate District 51

References
 
 United States Census Bureau 2007 TIGER/Line Shapefiles
 United States National Atlas

External links
 City-Data.com
 Illinois State Archives

Townships in Fayette County, Illinois
Populated places established in 1859
Townships in Illinois
1859 establishments in Illinois